Douglas Kent Weigle (born February 17, 1955) is an American former competitive ice dancer. With partner Judi Genovesi, he is the 1977 U.S. national champion. They represented the United States at the 1976 Winter Olympics where they placed 15th.

Following his retirement from competitive skating, he became a coach. He works as a coach in the Salt Lake City area.

Competitive highlights
(with Genovesi)

References

 
  

American male ice dancers
Figure skaters at the 1976 Winter Olympics
Olympic figure skaters of the United States
1955 births
Living people
People from Bethesda, Maryland